Henry Griffin Strong (July 18, 1873 – August 13, 1919) was an American businessman from Rochester, New York.  He was a partner in the Pritchard Strong Company, a manufacturer of stamped metal products. In 1910 organized the Strong-Crittenden Company, sales agents for the Lozier, Pope-Hartford and White automobiles.

He was born on July 18, 1873 in Rochester, New York. The son of Henry A. Strong, president of the Eastman Kodak Company, and Helen (Griffin) Strong.

He was married March 5, 1895, to Miss Millie Hoefler, daughter of Charles Hoefler of Rochester, N. Y. They had two sons: Alvah Griffin (1900-1966), in New York City; and Pritchard Hopkins(1906-1937), in Rochester, N. Y.

Henry G. Strong died in Los Angeles, California on August 13, 1919 as a result of complications from influenza.

References

External links 
 The Strong Family of Rochester, New York

1873 births
1919 deaths
Businesspeople from New York (state)
19th-century American businesspeople